Major-General Reginald Henry "Rex" Whitworth  (27 August 1916 – 22 May 2004) was a British Army officer.

Military career
Educated at Eton College, Balliol College, Oxford, and the Queen's College, Oxford, Whitworth was commissioned into the Grenadier Guards on 5 March 1940. He served as a staff officer during the Second World War.

After the war he became commanding officer of the 1st Battalion, Grenadier Guards, in 1956, commander of the Berlin Infantry Brigade in October 1961 and deputy military secretary at the Ministry of Defence in February 1964. He went on to be General Officer Commanding, Yorkshire District in March 1966, General Officer Commanding North East District in March 1967 and Chief of Staff of Southern Command in June 1968 before retiring in September 1970.

He was appointed a Commander of the Order of the British Empire in the 1964 New Year Honours and a Companion of the Order of the Bath in the 1969 Birthday Honours.

In retirement he was a fellow and bursar of Exeter College, Oxford, from 1970 to 1981.

Family
In 1946 he married June Rachel Edwards; they had three sons and one daughter.

Works

References

1916 births
2004 deaths
British Army generals
Companions of the Order of the Bath
Commanders of the Order of the British Empire
Grenadier Guards officers
People educated at Eton College
Alumni of Balliol College, Oxford
Alumni of The Queen's College, Oxford
British Army personnel of World War II